Cryptozona is a genus of air-breathing land snails, terrestrial pulmonate gastropod mollusks in the family Ariophantidae. These snails are restricted to South India and Sri Lanka.

Twenty five species are recognized.

Species
 Cryptozona albata (W.T. Blanford, 1880)
 Cryptozona basilessa (W.H. Benson, 1865)
 Cryptozona belangeri (G.P. Deshayes)
 Cryptozona bistrialis (H.H. Beck, 1837)
 Cryptozona ceraria (W.H. Benson, 1853)
 Cryptozona ceylanica (L. Pfeiffer)
 Cryptozona chenui (L. Pfeiffer, 1847)
 Cryptozona chrysoraphe O.F. von Möllendorff
 Cryptozona crossei (L. Pfeiffer, 1862)
 Cryptozona danae (L. Pfeiffer, 1862)
 Cryptozona dohrniana (L. Pfeiffer)
 Cryptozona granulosa (O.F. von Möllendorff)
 Cryptozona inflata (O.F. von Möllendorff)
 Cryptozona juliana (J.E. Gray, 1834)
 Cryptozona ligulata (A.E.J. Férussac, 1821)
 Cryptozona maderaspatana (J.E. Gray, 1834)
 Cryptozona menglunensis C. Chen, S.P. Zhang & X.T. Ma, 1995
 Cryptozona naninoides (W.H. Benson)
 Cryptozona novella (L. Pfeiffer, 1854)
 Cryptozona pharangensis (O.F. von Möllendorff, 1901)
 Cryptozona promiscua (E.A. Smith, 1895)
 Cryptozona rugosissima O.F. von Möllendorff, 1903
 Cryptozona semirugata (H.H. Beck, 1837)
 Cryptozona sisparica (W.T. Blanford, 1866)
 Cryptozona solata (W.H. Benson, 1848)

References